Club Voleibol Las Palmas akas Hotel Cantur Las Palmas was a Spanish volleyball club which is playing their home matches at the Centro Insular de Deportes in Las Palmas. The team participated in the Women's CEV Champions League 2006-07

Club Voleibol J.A.V. Olímpico is the name of the women's volleyball team that now represents Las Palmas in the Superliga Femenina de Voleibol.

Previous names
2002–2006 Hotel Cantur Las Palmas
2006–2008 Gran Canaria Hotel Cantur
2008–2011 Ciudad Las Palmas G.C. Cantur

External links
Official website

Spanish volleyball clubs
Sport in Las Palmas
Volleyball clubs established in 1976
Sports clubs disestablished in 2010
Sports teams in the Canary Islands